W.T.F. (Wisdom, Tenacity and Focus), also known as W.T.F. or just WTF, is the sixth and, to date, most recent studio album by American rapper Robert Van Winkle, known as Vanilla Ice. Originally scheduled for a 2009 release, it was officially released as a digital download on August 30, 2011, through Radium Records, executive produced by Vanilla Ice, Nick DeTomaso and Mark Mehwald.

In contrast to some previous releases by Van Winkle, the album included notable active collaborators Cowboy Troy and the Insane Clown Posse, both artists that Van Winkle has been an open fan of. It also includes songs with a variety of genre influences, ranging from straightforward hip hop to rap rock to country music and others. The album sold just 1,000 copies in the United States, according to Nielsen Music.

History
The album was first announced on Robert Van Winkle's Twitter account under the title Yesterday Is History, Tomorrow Is A Mystery, scheduled for an initial 2009 release on StandBy Records. The album was completed in February 2010, and it was announced that its new title would be WTF, an initialism for Wisdom, Tenacity and Focus. On May 17, 2010, the album's track listing was revealed through Van Winkle's official website. The album was officially released on Radium Records as a digital download through Amazon MP3 and iTunes on August 30, 2011. The album has since been released on CD by Radium Records following the success of his reality show The Vanilla Ice Project.

Music
The album touches upon diverse musical genres, including hip hop, acoustic, country and techno. It features guest appearances by Violent J of Insane Clown Posse and Cowboy Troy.

Track listing

Samples
Born on Halloween
"This Is Halloween" by the cast of The Nightmare Before Christmas
5446
"54-46 That's My Number" by Toots & the Maytals
Oh Momma
"Mammas Don't Let Your Babies Grow Up to Be Cowboys" by Ed Bruce

References

2011 albums
Vanilla Ice albums